The England women's national under-19 football team, also known as England women Under-19s or England women U19(s), is a youth association football team operated under the auspices of The Football Association. Its primary role is the development of players in preparation for the senior England women's national football team and is the second highest tier of development behind the under-23 level.
As long as they are eligible, players can play for England at any level, making it possible to play for the U19s, U23s or senior side, and again for the U19s. It is also possible to play for one country at youth level and another at senior level (providing the player is eligible).

The team's best achievement to date is winning the 2009 UEFA Women's Under-19 Championship.

UEFA Women's Under-19 Championship

Current squad

Head coach: Gemma Davies

Recent callups
The following players have also been called up to the England under-19 squad within the last twelve months.

This list may be incomplete.

  = Withdrew due to injury

Recent schedule and results
This list includes match results from the past 12 months, as well as any future matches that have been scheduled.

2022

2023

References

Under-19
Youth football in England
Women's national under-19 association football teams
European women's national under-19 association football teams